Doris May Roberts ( Green; November 4, 1925  – April 17, 2016) was an American actress whose career spanned seven decades of television and film. She received five Emmy Awards and a Screen Actors Guild award during her acting career, which began in 1951.

Roberts studied acting at The Neighborhood Playhouse School of the Theatre in New York City and started in films in 1961. She had several prominent roles in movies, including playing opposite Shirley Stoler in The Honeymoon Killers (1970), Elliott Gould in Little Murders (1971), Steven Keats in Hester Street (1975), Billy Crystal in Rabbit Test (1978), Robert Carradine in Number One with a Bullet (1987), and Cady McClain in Simple Justice (1989), among many others.

She achieved continuing success in television, becoming known for her role as Mildred Krebs in Remington Steele from 1983 to 1987 and her co-starring role as Raymond Barone's mother, Marie Barone, on the long-running CBS sitcom Everybody Loves Raymond (1996–2005). Towards the end of her acting career, she also had a prominent role opposite Tyler Perry in Madea's Witness Protection (2012).

She appeared as a guest on many talk and variety shows, as well as a panelist on several game shows. She was an advocate of animal rights and animal rights activism, supporting groups such as the United Activists for Animal Rights.

Early life
Doris May Green was born in St. Louis, Missouri, to a family of Russian-Jewish immigrants. She was raised by her mother, Ann (née Meltzer), and her maternal grandparents in The Bronx, New York, after her father, Larry Green, deserted the family. Roberts' stepfather, whose surname she took as her own, was Chester H. Roberts. Chester and Roberts' mother operated the Z.L. Rosenfield Agency, a stenographic service catering to playwrights and actors.

Career

Film and television

Roberts' acting career began in 1951 with a role on the TV series Studio One. She appeared in episodes of The Naked City (1958-1963), Way Out (1961), Ben Casey (1963), and The Defenders (1962-1963). In 1961, she made her film debut in Something Wild (1961).

She appeared in such 1960s/1970s films as A Lovely Way to Die, No Way to Treat a Lady, The Honeymoon Killers, Such Good Friends, Little Murders, and The Taking of Pelham One Two Three. In 1978, she appeared in a film about John F. Kennedy's assassination, Ruby and Oswald, in which she played Jack Ruby's sister. She also appeared very briefly in The Rose, as the mother of the title character played by Bette Midler.

In an interview with the Archive of American Television, Rue McClanahan confirmed that in 1972 she was approached by Norman Lear during the taping of an All in the Family episode to be a late replacement for Roberts, who was originally intended for the role of Vivian on Maude. (Roberts later guest starred in a 1976 All in the Family episode, "Edith's Night Out" as a bar patron who befriended Edith.) Roberts played Theresa Falco on Angie, and later appeared as Mildred Krebs on Remington Steele.

After Remington Steele ended, she starred in the TV movie remake of If It's Tuesday, It Still Must Be Belgium (1987) and the National Lampoon's Christmas Vacation (1989). She appeared on Alice, playing the mother of the title character (played by her former Broadway co-star Linda Lavin); on Barney Miller in two different roles, as the wife of a man who secretly visits a sex surrogate, and (in three episodes) as the harried wife of a middle-aged man who occasionally makes erratic decisions to give his life meaning; and on Full House as Danny Tanner's mother, Claire. She played the unhinged Flo Flotsky on four episodes of Soap; Dorelda Doremus, a faith healer, on Mary Hartman, Mary Hartman; and lonely Aunt Edna on Step by Step.

Roberts achieved much of her fame for her role as Marie Barone on Everybody Loves Raymond. She was reportedly one of 100 actresses considered for the role. For her work on the series, she was nominated for seven Emmy Awards (and won four times) for Outstanding Supporting Actress in a Comedy Series. She had previously won an Emmy for a guest appearance on St. Elsewhere, playing a homeless woman, and was also once nominated for her role on Remington Steele. She was nominated for appearances on Perfect Strangers and a PBS special called The Sunset Gang. In 2003, she made a guest appearance as Gordo's grandmother in Lizzie McGuire. The same year, she received a star on the Hollywood Walk of Fame. In 2006, she starred in Our House as a wealthy woman who took in homeless people into her own house, and in Grandma's Boy.

In 2007, she made a guest appearance on Law & Order: Criminal Intent. In 2008, she appeared in the romantic comedy Play the Game alongside Andy Griffith, who plays a lonely widowed grandfather re-entering the dating world after a 60-year hiatus. Roberts appeared in the 2009 film Aliens in the Attic, which was filmed in Auckland, New Zealand. She played George Needleman's mother in Tyler Perry's Madea's Witness Protection (2012).

On September 23, 2010, she played Ms. Rinsky, Brick Heck's teacher in the second-season premiere episode of The Middle. This appearance reunited her with Patricia Heaton, her co-star from Everybody Loves Raymond. The two women's characters, of course, clash, with Heaton's Frankie Heck always managing to get pushed out of sorts into disastrous action usually resulting in some kind of public chastisement by Roberts' Rinsky, an expert at passive-aggressive manipulation. Roberts returned in two other episodes that season, "The Math Class" and the finale, "Back to Summer". In 2013 she was a special guest star in the Major Crimes episode "There’s No Place Like Home".

Stage
Roberts' stage career began in the 1950s on Broadway. She appeared in numerous Broadway shows including William Marchant's The Desk Set (with Shirley Booth), Neil Simon's The Last of the Red Hot Lovers (with James Coco and Linda Lavin) and Terrence McNally's Bad Habits. She starred in McNally's Unusual Acts of Devotion at the LaJolla Playhouse in June 2009.

Honors
In May 2005, Roberts received an honorary doctorate of fine arts from the University of South Carolina. She was awarded the Ellis Island Medal of Honor on May 7, 2011. She was awarded a star on the Hollywood Walk of Fame in February 2003, at 7021 Hollywood Blvd.

Advocacy and other work
On September 4, 2002, Roberts testified before a U.S. Congressional panel that age discrimination was prevalent in Hollywood. She was a registered Democrat.

An animal rights advocate, Roberts worked with the group Puppies Behind Bars, which works with inmates in training guide dogs and assistance dogs for the physically disabled and elderly, as well as dogs trained in explosives detection to be used by law enforcement agencies. She was also active with the Children with AIDS Foundation, where she served as chairwoman.

With Danelle Morton, Roberts wrote Are You Hungry, Dear? Life, Laughs, and Lasagna. The book was published by St. Martin's Press in 2003, and serves as a memoir as well as a collection of some of Roberts' recipes.

Personal life
Roberts married Michael Cannata in 1956; they divorced in 1962. They had one son. She had three grandchildren. Her second husband was writer William Goyen and they were married from 1963 until his death from leukemia in 1983.

Death
Roberts died in her sleep on April 17, 2016, at her home in Los Angeles following a stroke, at the age of 90. She had also suffered from pulmonary hypertension for many years before her death. Just a month after her death she was memorialized in New York City, where a public tribute was held at the Ambassador Theatre, where she appeared in 1972 in The Secret Affairs of Mildred Wild with Maureen Stapleton. Among the stars attending the service were Ray Romano and Patricia Heaton (her co-stars from Everybody Loves Raymond) and actor David Hyde Pierce. Romano said of Roberts: 

In another interview Romano jokingly referred to the kissing thing that Roberts would do off-camera: "You know how great she was then!" He also added: "We had a little get together for her. She was one of a kind. She can outwork it, outdrink it, good kisser, I was joking! I appreciated her." Just a month after her death, he said:  She was interred at Pierce Brothers Westwood Village Memorial Park and Mortuary in Los Angeles, California.

Filmography

Film

Television

Stage

Awards and nominations

References

Sources

External links

 
 
 
 
 Doris Roberts at the University of Wisconsin's Actors Studio audio collection
 National Ethnic Coalition of Organizations website
 
 

1925 births
2016 deaths
Actresses from St. Louis
Actresses from New York City
American film actresses
American people of Russian-Jewish descent
American stage actresses
American television actresses
Jewish American actresses
Outstanding Performance by a Supporting Actress in a Drama Series Primetime Emmy Award winners
Outstanding Performance by a Supporting Actress in a Comedy Series Primetime Emmy Award winners
People from the Bronx
California Democrats
New York (state) Democrats
21st-century American Jews
21st-century American women